Machakaaran is a 2007 Indian Tamil romantic action film written and directed by Tamilvannan of Kalvanin Kadhali fame. The film stars Jeevan and Kamna Jethmalani in lead roles. The film score and soundtrack were composed by Yuvan Shankar Raja. The film was released on 8 November 2007 during Diwali and released to negative reviews. However, the film was dubbed into Telugu later and released as Dheera in 2009.

Plot
Vicky (Jeevan) is the eldest son of a railway officer. He is a perpetual loser in whatever he does and is looked down by his other family members. One day, he meets Shivani (Kamna Jethmalani), the daughter of a rich textile tycoon, who has brought all the luck to her father Rajangam (G. M. Kumar). Soon, the "unlucky" Vicky is drawn towards the "lucky" Shivani, and they fall madly in love. Due to circumstances, they are forced to elope, with Shivani’s cop brother in hot pursuit. The lovers decide to go to Rajangam’s village in Theni, where he is considered and treated as "Mr. Nice Guy", a philanthropist and savior of the locals, and is given the honour of conducting the temple Thiruvizha every year. How the runaway couple against all odds rips his good guy image and exposes him in front of the entire village forms the rest of this predictable yarn.

Cast

Soundtrack

For the musical score of Machakaaran, director Thamizhvaanan teamed up with composer Yuvan Shankar Raja again, after the duo gave chart-topping songs in the director's previous venture Kalvanin Kadhali (2005). The soundtrack, which features 5 tracks overall, was released on 24 October 2007 and garnered generally positive reviews.

References

External links
 
 

2007 films
2007 action films
2000s Tamil-language films